Marc Séguin may refer to:
Marc Séguin (painter) (born 1970), Canadian painter and novelist
Marc Seguin (1786–1875), French engineer, inventor of the wire-cable suspension bridge